Corectopia is the displacement of the eye's pupil from its normal, central position. It may be associated with high myopia or ectopia lentis, among other conditions. Medical or surgical intervention may be indicated for the treatment of corectopia in some cases.

See also
Eye injury
Iridodialysis
Monocular diplopia
Polycoria
Axenfeld-Rieger syndrome

References

Eye diseases